Take Your Time is the second and final studio album released by Australian R&B band Kulcha. The album was released in May 1997 and peaked a number 40 on the ARIA charts.

Track listing
 "Intro" - 1:35
 "Do You Like It?" - 3:38
 "Booty Funk" - 3:53
 "Always Be" - 5:06
 "Take Your Time" - 3:15
 "Slow Motion"	- 4:21
 "Fly Girl" (Interlude) - 1:37
 "All I Want" - 3:49
 "Treat Her Like a Lady" - 3:53
 "Give It to Me" - 3:49
 "I Wanna Know" - 3:42
 "Give Me Your Love" - 3:55

Charts

Release history

References

1997 albums
Kulcha (band) albums